Bassam Al-Khatib (born October 5, 1975) is a retired Jordanian professional footballer who played most of his career for Jordanian club Al-Ahli Amman alongside Jordan national football team. He is currently assistant coach for Jordanian football club Shabab Al-Ordon Club.

Al-Khatib also appeared with Indian NFL side Mahindra United in 1999–2000.

International goals

References

External links 
 
 
 
 Bassam Al-Khatib Coaching In ABS (BY WARD)

1975 births
Living people
Jordanian footballers
Jordan international footballers
Association football forwards
Sportspeople from Amman
Shabab Al-Ordon Club players
Al-Ahli SC (Amman) players
Mahindra United FC players
Jordanian Pro League players
Indian Super League players
Jordanian expatriate footballers
Jordanian expatriate sportspeople in India
Expatriate footballers in India